New Socialist Party may refer to:

New Socialist Party (France)
New Socialist Party (Japan)
New Socialist Party (San Marino)

See also
New Italian Socialist Party
Socialist Party (disambiguation)